498th may refer to:

498th Bombardment Squadron, inactive United States Air Force unit
498th Fighter-Interceptor Squadron, inactive United States Air Force unit
498th Nuclear Systems Wing (498 NSW), wing of the United States Air Force based at Kirtland Air Force Base, New Mexico
498th paratroopers battalion, Romanian Land Forces brigade formed on 25 October 2011

See also
498 (number)
498, the year 498 (CDXCVIII) of the Julian calendar
498 BC